Rothamsted Park is a  public park in Harpenden, Hertfordshire.

History

The park was formerly part of the Manor of Rothamsted, later Rothamsted estate, owned by Sir John Lawes. He initiated agricultural experiments in 1843, which led to the founding of the nearby Rothamsted Experimental Station. He also created the formal entrance from Leyton Road to what is now the Park and planted the avenue of Lime trees. In 1931, the family decided to sell the estate, and after a successful public appeal, the Experimental Station was able to finance its purchase of the estate in 1934.  In 1938 the Harpenden Urban District Council purchased the land now known as Rothamsted park from the Experimental Station, in order to provide playing fields and to preserve an important open space. Rothamsted Park is also home to Harpenden Town FC.

The Park's main entrance gates were removed for salvage during the Second World War, and after the war the restoration of the entrance was paid for by the Friends Provident Insurance Company.

References
St Albans City Council site

Parks and open spaces in Hertfordshire
Harpenden